Paul Dlamini is a Swazi politician who was deputy prime minister of Eswatini from to 2013 to 2018. He was the first of the Dlamini clan to be appointed to such a high position in the national government. In October 2015 he led an eight-member delegation to Taiwan to support celebration of the 104th National Day of the Republic of China.

References

Swazi politicians
Government ministers of Eswatini
Deputy Prime ministers of Eswatini